House of Montfort was a medieval French noble house that eventually found its way to the Kingdom of England and originated the famous Simon de Montfort, 6th Earl of Leicester; although his father Simon de Monfort the Elder, leader of the French Crusaders during the Albigensian Crusade, is far more notorious in France and among military medievalists.

The family began when Hugh Capet granted a petty lordship to Guillaume de Montfort in the Île-de-France. His successors were to be the vassals of the counts of Beaumont. Guillaume's son, Amaury began building a castle that would eventually become the eponymous Montfort-l'Amaury. The project, however, was incomplete when he died circa 1053, but his son, Simon was able to finish it in 1067. His great-grandson, Simon IV would eventually marry the heiress of Leicester and their son, Simon V would become the first Montfort earl of Leicester.

During the 13th century the family lost their ancestral seat of Montfort-l'Amaury to the House of Dreux.

Genealogy

Guillaume
 Amaury I
 Simon I
 Amaury II
 Isabel
 Bertrade
 Richard
 Simon II
 Amaury III
 Amaury IV
 Simon III
 Amaury V
 Simon IV
 Simon V
 Amaury VI
 John I
 Beatrice
 Marguerite
 Laure
 Adela
 Pernelle
 Simon V
 Henry
 Simon VI
 Amaury
 Guy of Nola
 Anastasia
 Tomasina
 Joanna
 Richard
 Eleanor
 Guy of Bigorre
 Alice
 Pernelle of Bigorre
 Guy I of Sidon
 Philip I
 Philip II
 John
 Laure
 Eleonore
 Jeanne
 John of Tyre
 Humphrey
 Amaury of Montfort
 Rupen of Montfort
 Pernelle
 Alicia
 Agnes 
 Guy II of Sidon
 Petronilla
 Bertrade
 Agnès
 Guillaume
 Adeliza
 Mainier
 Eva

References

 
French noble families